The Europe/Africa Zone was one of the three zones of the regional Davis Cup competition in 2001.

In the Europe/Africa Zone there were four different tiers, called groups, in which teams competed against each other to advance to the upper tier. Winners in Group II advanced to the Europe/Africa Zone Group I. Teams who lost their respective ties competed in the relegation play-offs, with winning teams remaining in Group II, whereas teams who lost their play-offs were relegated to the Europe/Africa Zone Group III in 2002.

Participating nations

Draw

 and  promoted to Group I in 2002.

First round

Hungary vs. Monaco

Ireland vs. Denmark

Turkey vs. Greece

Moldova vs. Armenia

Estonia vs. Norway

Luxembourg vs. Ivory Coast

Poland vs. Israel

South Africa vs. Yugoslavia

Second round

Denmark vs. Hungary

Greece vs. Armenia

Luxembourg vs. Norway

Israel vs. South Africa

Relegation play-offs

Monaco vs. Ireland

Moldova vs. Turkey

Ivory Coast vs. Estonia

Yugoslavia vs. Poland

Third round

Greece vs. Denmark

Luxembourg vs. Israel

References

External links
Davis Cup official website

Davis Cup Europe/Africa Zone
Europe Africa Zone Group II